The 1958–59 Kansas Jayhawks men's basketball team represented the University of Kansas during the 1958–59 college men's basketball season.

Roster
Ron Loneski
Bill Bridges
Al Donaghue
Bob Billings
Dee Ketchum
Bob Hickman
Monte Johnson
Jim Hoffman
Lyn Kindred
Gary Thompson
Dick Gisel
Russ Marcinek
Doyle Schick

Schedule

References

Kansas Jayhawks men's basketball seasons
Kansas
Kansas
Kansas